Cairo, Tennessee may refer to the following places:
Cairo, Crockett County, Tennessee, an unincorporated community
Cairo, Sumner County, Tennessee, an unincorporated community